American girl group the Pussycat Dolls have recorded songs for two studio albums, and have collaborated with other artists for featured songs on their respective albums. Originally a burlesque cabaret act, the Pussycat Dolls transformed into a recording act under the supervision of Robin Antin and  then-A&M Records president and producer Ron Fair. After recruiting lead singer Nicole Scherzinger, they began to work with Fair who executive produced their 2005 debut album, PCD. The album contains 12 songs of which the majority was co-produced by Fair and Tal Herzberg. The most part of the album contains original songs produced by Cee Lo Green, will.i.am, Timbaland, Rich Harrison. It also includes cover versions of songs by Donna Summer, the Supremes and Soft Cell.

List of songs

See also
 The Pussycat Dolls discography

References

Pussycat Dolls
The Pussycat Dolls songs